is a Japanese light novel series written by FUNA. The series originated on the Shōsetsuka ni Narō website, before being published in print with illustrations by Tōzai by Kodansha beginning in June 2017. As of March 2023, eight volumes have been released. A manga adaptation, illustrated by Keisuke Motoe, began serialization on the Niconico-based Suiyōbi no Sirius platform in June 2017. As of February 2023, the manga's individual chapters have been collected into eleven volumes. An anime television series adaptation by Felix Film premiered in January 2023.

Plot
Mitsuha Yamano is a high school orphan with little money from inheritance. After being pushed off a cliff, Mitsuha accidentally gained the ability to teleport and travel between Earth and a medieval world from an interdimensional entity. Worried if she ever were to lose this ability and get stuck in either world, she makes it her goal in exploiting her power to exchange foreign currency and modernized items or jewelry for retirement funds in her exploration.

Characters

A young high school graduate who lost her parents and beloved older brother in an accident. After being pushed off a cliff, she discovers that she has accidentally gained the ability to travel between worlds and vast regenerative abilities from an interdimensional entity. Using this new advantage, she begins importing modern items from Earth to make her way in the other world and earn her own retirement funds. In the other world, she claims to be a noble named Mitsuha von Yamano and that she fled her home country due to a succession crisis.

A forest farmer's daughter who becomes Mitsuha's first new friend in the other world.

A princess who meets Mitsuha after visiting her store. Like many others, she is fascinated by the various forms of technology Mitsuha transported in from Japan.

Mitsuha's older otaku brother, whom she has looked up to until his untimely death. She remembers him in frequent flashbacks and takes his smart advice to heart after she ends up in the other world.

A nameless world-wandering being composed of mental energy, who appears to Mitsuha in the form of a lucky cat statue her brother had gifted to her. When she was falling off a cliff, Mitsuha's will inadvertently latched onto that entity's essence, ripping out and appropriating some of it, which gave her her new world-travelling abilities.

Media

Light novel
Written by FUNA, the light novel began publication on the novel posting website Shōsetsuka ni Narō on November 2, 2015. The series was later acquired by Kodansha, who published the series with illustrations by Tōzai under their Kodansha Ranobe Books imprint beginning on June 29, 2017. As of March 2023, eight volumes have been released.

In November 2018, Sol Press announced that they licensed the light novel for English publication. They released two volumes before going defunct. After Sol Press lost the rights, Kodansha USA announced at Anime Expo 2022 that they licensed the series for English publication.

Volume list

Manga
A manga adaptation, illustrated by Keisuke Motoe, began serialization on Kodansha's Niconico-based Suiyōbi no Sirius manga service on June 14, 2017. As of February 2023, the series' individual chapters have been collected into eleven tankōbon volumes.

In November 2018, Sol Press announced that they also licensed the manga adaptation for English publication. They released one volume in 2019. After Sol Press lost the rights, Kodansha USA announced at San Diego Comic-Con 2022 that they also licensed the manga adaptation for English publication.

Volume list

Anime
On July 26, 2022, an anime television series adaptation was announced. It is produced by Felix Film and directed by Hiroshi Tamada, with Akihiko Inari writing the scripts and Yūki Fukuchi designing the characters. It premiered on January 8, 2023, on ABC and TV Asahi's  programming block. At Anime NYC 2022, Crunchyroll announced that they licensed the series.

Episode list

Reception
Rebecca Silverman from Anime News Network praised the illustrations and latter half of the first novel, while criticizing the novel's story for making what Silverman felt were weird narrative choices.

See also
 Didn't I Say to Make My Abilities Average in the Next Life?!, another light novel series by FUNA
 I Shall Survive Using Potions!, another light novel series by FUNA
 The Eminence in Shadow, another light novel series illustrated by Tōzai

Notes

References

External links
  
  
 

2017 Japanese novels
2023 anime television series debuts
Anime and manga based on light novels
Asahi Broadcasting Corporation original programming
Crunchyroll anime
Felix Film
Isekai anime and manga
Isekai novels and light novels
Japanese webcomics
Kodansha books
Kodansha manga
Light novels
Light novels first published online
Shōnen manga
Shōsetsuka ni Narō
Slice of life anime and manga
Webcomics in print